Hélder Mendes Abreu Ornelas (born 6 May 1974 in Nova Lisboa, Angola) is a Portuguese long-distance runner.

He finished eighth in the long race at the 2001 World Cross Country Championships, fifteenth in the marathon at the 2006 European Athletics Championships and won the 2007 edition of Prague International Marathon. He also won the 2005 Milan Marathon

Doping 
In 2012 Ornelas became the first track and field athlete to get suspended for doping based on the biological passport. He received a four-year suspension in May 2012.

Achievements

Personal bests
1500 metres - 3:46.97 min (1996)
3000 metres - 7:50.02 min (2000)
5000 metres - 13:18.56 min (2000)
10,000 metres - 28:01.94 min (2001)
Half marathon - 1:03:27 hrs (2005)
marathon - 2:10:00 hrs (2005)

See also
 List of doping cases in sport

References

External links

1974 births
Living people
Doping cases in athletics
Portuguese male long-distance runners
Portuguese sportspeople in doping cases
Athletes (track and field) at the 2000 Summer Olympics
Athletes (track and field) at the 2008 Summer Olympics
Olympic athletes of Portugal
Portuguese sportspeople of Angolan descent
Portuguese male marathon runners